The long-nosed hocicudo (Oxymycterus nasutus) is a South American rodent species found in southeastern Brazil and Uruguay.

Diet
It hunts grubs and worms under the cover of leaves, logs, and stones.

Description
It has a long, flexible nose, and usually utilizes the tunnels and pathways created by other rodents.

References

Oxymycterus
Mammals described in 1837